The Notting Hill Arts Club is a music and arts venue in Notting Hill, central London. The venue holds club nights every night of the week. Its range of events include interactive crafts, themed Soviet nights, and a Death Disco club night run by Creation Records founder Alan McGee. Former guest DJs have included Courtney Love and Mick Jones. The Guardian described the venue as "a haven for indie celebs and punk veterans".

See also

List of London venues

External links
 
 Notting Hill Arts Club Review

Event venues with year of establishment missing
Buildings and structures in Notting Hill
Nightclubs in London
Tourist attractions in the Royal Borough of Kensington and Chelsea